Marcos Baghdatis was the defending champion, but lost in the quarterfinals to Ivan Ljubičić.

Fernando González won in the final 6–1, 3–6, 6–1, against Tommy Robredo.

Seeds

Draw

Finals

Top half

Bottom half

External links
Draw
Qualifying draw

China Open
2007 China Open (tennis)